Gabriel Rodrigues dos Santos (born 5 June 1981), commonly known as just Gabriel, is a Brazilian retired footballer, who played mostly as a wing-back down the right hand side of the pitch. He earned his only full cap for the Brazil national team in a friendly win against Guatemala on 27 April 2005.

Career
He has spent most of his career in his native Brazil, having started in São Paulo and reaching his peak while playing for Fluminense in 2005 and 2007. He had a short spell playing for Málaga at Spanish La Liga in 2006, but was unable to prevent the club's relegation and returned to play for Cruzeiro.

After being released by Cruzeiro on 22 May 2007, Gabriel signed for one of his former clubs, Fluminense, on 25 August 2007. He played an important role in the team's Copa Libertadores performance, ending up as runners up.

On 17 July 2008, he agreed terms with Panathinaikos at a cost of €1.2 million. He was brought in as the new attacking minded right full back but it seems that he needed more work in his defensive game for the European standards. For that reason, Panathinaikos manager Henk ten Cate used Gabriel mainly as a right midfielder or winger in 4–2–3–1 and 4–3–2–1 formations.

In August 2010, Gabriel moved to Brazilian side Grêmio on loan. The move was made permanent in July 2011.

Gabriel transferred to Internacional in January 2013.

On 23 July 2015, Gabriel signed with Fort Lauderdale Strikers of the North American Soccer League.

On 7 May Gabriel made his debut for Miami Dade alongside former Brazil Captain Emerson Ferreira da Rosa, scoring 1 goal in a 3x1 victory against Jupiter United. On 2 July, he won the 2017 Regular Season Championship undefeated in his first year with the club.

Honours

Club
São Paulo
Tournament Rio – São Paulo: 2001
São Paulo State League: 2002

Fluminense
Rio de Janeiro State League: 2005

Panathinaikos
Superleague Greece: 2009–10
Greek Football Cup: 2010

Internacional
Campeonato Gaúcho: 2013

Miami Dade FC
APSL Regular Season Champions: 2017
APSL Champions: 2017

Individual
 Campeonato Brasileiro Série A Team of the Year: 2005

References

External links
 sambafoot
 Gabriel está de volta ao Fluminense
 zerozero.pt
 La Liga stats
 Guardian Stats Centre

1981 births
Living people
Brazilian footballers
Brazil international footballers
Brazilian expatriate footballers
São Paulo FC players
Cruzeiro Esporte Clube players
Fluminense FC players
Málaga CF players
Panathinaikos F.C. players
Grêmio Foot-Ball Porto Alegrense players
Sport Club Internacional players
Campeonato Brasileiro Série A players
La Liga players
Super League Greece players
Expatriate footballers in Spain
Expatriate footballers in Greece
Fort Lauderdale Strikers players
North American Soccer League players
Association football defenders
Miami Dade FC players
Footballers from São Paulo